is a Japanese voice actress, singer and idol. She was previously affiliated with the agency With Line, but is currently represented by First Wind Production. She is also member of idol girlgroup, "teaRLove" which are formed by Marine Entertainment. The group are consists member from the voice actresses.

Biography

Her synchronization is Maiko Irie and Maria Sashide.

Filmography

Anime 
2017
 Anonymous Noise – Audience
 Love Tyrant – Land crew, girls

2018
 Anima Yell! – Kon Akitsune
 Death March to the Parallel World Rhapsody – Pochi
 Grand Blue – Game voice B
 Harukana Receive – Student 1
 Märchen Mädchen – Lucy Burton
 Muhyo & Roji's Bureau of Supernatural Investigation – Student
 Planet With – Younger sister, reporter 2

2019
Aikatsu Friends! – Junior high school fan
 Are You Lost? – Asuka Suzumori
 Astra Lost in Space – Schoolgirl
 Chidori RSC – Ako Tōma
 Didn't I Say to Make My Abilities Average in the Next Life?! – Renny
 Hakata Mentai! Pirikarako-chan – Pirikarako-chan
 Hitori Bocchi no Marumaru Seikatsu – Notsugi Futago
 Kedama no Gonjirō – Second girl
 O Maidens in Your Savage Season – Kazusa Onodera
 The Promised Neverland – Phil

2020
 Healin' Good PreCure – Hinata Hiramitsu/Cure Sparkle

2021
 That Time I Got Reincarnated as a Slime – Kirara Mizutani
 Fena: Pirate Princess – Hannah Snell

2022
In the Heart of Kunoichi Tsubaki – Hosenka
Don't Hurt Me, My Healer! – Ellie

2024
The Idolmaster Shiny Colors – Kaho Komiya

Video games 
2020
 Yoru, Tomosu – Maya Aoyagi
2021 
 Loopers – Hilda
 The Caligula Effect 2 – Niko Komamura
 Counter:Side – Gabriel Jun the Vicious Breaker, Liv Allen

Dubbing 
2023
 The Last Summoner – Stan

References

External links 
Official agency profile 

1998 births
Living people
Actors from Yamanashi Prefecture
Japanese video game actresses
Japanese voice actresses